Herbert Quin (1891 – 16 April 1968) was a unionist politician and barrister in Northern Ireland.

Quin studied at the Royal Belfast Academical Institution and Queen's University Belfast before joining the Irish Bar.  He was also a chartered accountant.  In 1944, he was elected as an Ulster Unionist Party MP for the Stormont seat of Queen's University.  He stood down at the 1949 Northern Ireland general election but, the following year, was elected to the Senate of Northern Ireland, serving until his death in 1968.

References

1891 births
1968 deaths
Barristers from Northern Ireland
Ulster Unionist Party members of the House of Commons of Northern Ireland
Members of the House of Commons of Northern Ireland 1938–1945
Members of the House of Commons of Northern Ireland 1945–1949
Members of the Senate of Northern Ireland 1949–1953
Members of the Senate of Northern Ireland 1953–1957
Members of the Senate of Northern Ireland 1957–1961
Members of the Senate of Northern Ireland 1961–1965
Members of the Senate of Northern Ireland 1965–1969
Members of the House of Commons of Northern Ireland for Queen's University of Belfast
Ulster Unionist Party members of the Senate of Northern Ireland